4-MMA may refer to:
4-Methoxy-N-methylamphetamine
4-Methylmethamphetamine